Ricardo Artur de Araújo Pereira (born 28 April 1974) is a Portuguese comedian, political commentator and journalist. Pereira first rose to national notoriety in the early 2000s as a member of the Portuguese comedy group, Gato Fedorento.

Life
He was born in Lisbon. His father is a TAP aircraft pilot and his mother a flight attendant. He has a degree in Social Communication from the Universidade Católica Portuguesa. He has also worked as a journalist for the Jornal de Letras, Artes e Ideias.

He was a writer for Produções Fictícias, and was one of the writers of Herman 98, Herman 99 and Herman Difusão Portuguesa (hosted by the Portuguese comedian Herman José), and he also co-wrote Maria Rueff's show O Programa da Maria (2001), Felizes para Sempre (Expresso), As Crónicas de José Estebes, on Diário de Notícias, among many others.

In 2003 he made his first appearance in television acting in the series O Perfeito Anormal (The Perfect Freak) along with fellow Gato Fedorento member Zé Diogo Quintela. This series was broadcast on SIC Radical, a television channel aimed at a younger audience. The series was produced on a very low budget and was the boost that the comedians needed to get onto television.

In the same year, he started the Gato Fedorento project, a comedy project with great impact on Portuguese television, along with Zé Diogo Quintela, Miguel Góis and Tiago Dores. They started a series of programs with name Gato Fedorento, Série Fonseca, Série Meireles and Série Barbosa (note that the series' names are usual Portuguese surnames and every character in the series had the same surname as the series' name) on SIC Radical.Since then they moved twice: in 2006, to RTP1, with Gato Fedorento, Série Lopes da Silva and, later, with Diz Que é Uma Espécie De Magazine; and in 2008, to SIC with Gato Fedorento:Zé Carlos and, later, Gato Fedorento Esmiúça os Sufrágios (a daily, 25 minutes long, show that aired between 14 September – 23 October 2009). Pereira also has an internet blog with fellow Gato Fedorento members.

He has the skill of impersonating sports and politics personalities as well as Portuguese regional stereotypes. These skills are used in the television series as well as in advertising campaigns in television. He is also a columnist in the magazine Visão and A Bola, one of the most recognised sports newspaper in Portugal.

He was working at Rádio Comercial until recently, where he had a show named Mixórdia de Temáticas which talks about a wide range of current events. He is also back at television with "Gente que não sabe estar" at TVI. 

Ricardo was voted 76th Greatest Portuguese of all time in a Poll conducted by RTP (Rádio Televisão Portuguesa) for its Show "Grandes Portugueses", based on a similar show, "100 Greatest Britons", aired on BBC. 

In 2019, he won a Golden Globe for Comedy at the 24th Portuguese Golden Globes Gala. While he was unable to attend the event, he sent in a video where he thanked everyone involved in his shows.

Personal life 
He is married to former radio producer Maria José Areias, with whom he has two daughters: Rita and Maria Inês. He is a supporter of S.L. Benfica and an atheist.

References 

1974 births
Living people
Portuguese male comedians
Portuguese male writers
Catholic University of Portugal alumni
People from Lisbon
Portuguese atheists
Golden Globes (Portugal) winners